Hugo Blotius or Hugo de Bloote (1533, Delft – 29 January 1608, Vienna) was a Dutch scholar and librarian. He first became interested in librarianship while studying for a law degree in Orléans between 1566 and 1567. In 1575, Emperor Maximilian II appointed him the first head librarian of the Imperial Library.

References

1533 births
1608 deaths
Dutch librarians
Dutch academics
Dutch expatriates in Austria
People from Delft